Dudley George Roe (March 23, 1881 – January 4, 1970), a Democrat, was a U.S. Congressman who represented the Maryland's 1st congressional district from 1945 to 1947.

Roe was born in Sudlersville, Maryland, and attended the public schools.  He graduated from Washington College of Chestertown, Maryland, in 1903 and from the law department of the University of Maryland, Baltimore in 1905, where he was admitted to the bar in 1905 and commenced practice.  He served in the Maryland House of Delegates from 1907 to 1909, and as a member of the Maryland Senate from 1923 to 1935 and from 1939 to 1943, serving as Democratic floor leader from 1939 to 1943.  He was also a delegate to the Democratic National Convention in 1928.

Roe was elected as a Democrat to the Seventy-ninth Congress, serving from January 3, 1945, to January 3, 1947.  He was an unsuccessful candidate for reelection in 1946 to the Eightieth Congress.  After Congress, Roe worked as a farmer, banker, and grain dealer in Sudlersville.  He served as director and later president of Sudlersville Bank of Maryland, until he resigned in 1967.  He continued as chairman of the board of directors of the bank until his death in Chestertown.  He is interred in Sudlersville Cemetery.

References

1881 births
1970 deaths
Democratic Party Maryland state senators
Democratic Party members of the Maryland House of Delegates
University of Maryland, Baltimore alumni
Washington College alumni
Democratic Party members of the United States House of Representatives from Maryland
20th-century American politicians